Fort Tompkins was a small fort in Plattsburgh, New York, circa 1814.

After the British defeat at the Battle of Plattsburgh, two additional forts were added near Forts Brown, Moreau, and Scott. Fort Tompkins was constructed southwest of Brown and contained three cannons. Fort Gaines was added between Tompkins and the lake, which created a pentagon shaped complex which was later connected with curtain walls.

Sources
 New York State Division of Military and Naval Affairs: Military History

Buildings and structures in Clinton County, New York
Tompkins (Plattsburgh)
Tompkins (Plattsburgh)